Thomas Muster was the defending champion but did not compete that year.

Alberto Berasategui won in the final 6–1, 7–6(7–5) against Carlos Moyá.

Seeds
A champion seed is indicated in bold text while text in italics indicates the round in which that seed was eliminated.

  Boris Becker (first round)
 n/a
  Carlos Moyá (final)
  Alberto Berasategui (champion)
  Francisco Clavet (quarterfinals)
 n/a
  Gilbert Schaller (second round)
  Jiří Novák (quarterfinals)

Draw

External links
 1996 Open Romania draw

1996 Singles
Singles
1996 in Romanian tennis